Highway 707 is a highway in the Canadian province of Saskatchewan. It runs from Highway 18 near Beaubier to Highway 35.

Highway 707 also passes near the community of Ratcliffe.

See also 
Roads in Saskatchewan
Transportation in Saskatchewan

References

External links 
 Tourism Saskatchewan road map: South East
 Google Maps: Saskatchewan Highway 707 route

707